Solecurtus is a genus of saltwater clam, a marine bivalve molluscs in the family Solecurtidae.

Species
The World Register of Marine Species includes the following species in the genus :

 Solecurtus afroccidentalis Cosel, 1989
 Solecurtus australis (Dunker, 1862)
 Solecurtus baldwini Dall, Bartsch & Rehder, 1938
 †Solecurtus bensoni Finlay, 1924 
 Solecurtus broggii Pilsbry & Olsson, 1941
 Solecurtus candidus (Brocchi, 1814)
 † Solecurtus chattonensis Finlay, 1924 
 Solecurtus consimilis Kuroda & Habe in Habe, 1961
 Solecurtus cumingianus (Dunker, 1862)
 Solecurtus divaricatus (Lischke, 1869)
 † Solecurtus evolutus Finlay, 1924 
 Solecurtus exaratus (Philippi, 1849)
 Solecurtus guaymasensis (Lowe, 1935)
 Solecurtus leone Woolacott, 1954
 Solecurtus lineatus (Spengler, 1794)
 Solecurtus markushuberi Thach, 2020
 † Solecurtus murrayvianus Finlay, 1927 
 Solecurtus philippinarum (Dunker, 1862)
 Solecurtus quaeritus M. Huber, 2010
 Solecurtus rhombus (Spengler, 1794)
 Solecurtus sagamiensis Kuroda & Habe in Kuroda & al., 1971
 Solecurtus sanctaemarthae d'Orbigny, 1853
 Solecurtus scopula (Turton, 1822)
 Solecurtus strigilatus (Linnaeus, 1758)
 Solecurtus subcandidus Sturany, 1899
 Solecurtus sulcatus (Dunker, 1862)
Taxon inquirendum
 Solecurtus debilis Gould, 1861

Synonyms
 Solecurtus abbreviatus Gould, 1861: synonym of Azorinus abbreviatus (Gould, 1861)
 Solecurtus affinis C. B. Adams, 1852: synonym of Tagelus affinis (C. B. Adams, 1852) (original combination)
 Solecurtus albus Blainville, 1827: synonym of Solecurtus scopula (W. Turton, 1822)
 Solecurtus angulatus G. B. Sowerby II, 1874: synonym of Tagelus adansonii (Bosc, 1801)
 Solecurtus bidens (Hanley, 1842): synonym of Tagelus divisus (Spengler, 1794)
 Solecurtus californianus Conrad, 1837: synonym of Tagelus californianus (Conrad, 1837) (original combination)
 Solecurtus chamasolen (da Costa, 1778): synonym of Azorinus chamasolen (da Costa, 1778)
 Solecurtus coquimbensis G. B. Sowerby II, 1874: synonym of Tagelus dombeii (Lamarck, 1818)
 Solecurtus cylindricus G. B. Sowerby II, 1874: synonym of Tagelus affinis (C. B. Adams, 1852) (uncertain synonym)
 Solecurtus dombeyi: synonym of Tagelus dombeii (Lamarck, 1818) (incorrect subsequent spelling)
 Solecurtus dunkeri Kira, 1959: synonym of Solecurtus divaricatus (Lischke, 1869)
 Solecurtus ellipticus Tate, 1887 †: synonym of Solecurtus murrayvianus Finlay, 1927 † (invalid, not Dana, 1849)
 Solecurtus lucidus Conrad, 1837: synonym of Siliqua lucida (Conrad, 1837) (original combination)
 Solecurtus mollis G. B. Sowerby II, 1874: synonym of Sinonovacula mollis (G. B. Sowerby II, 1874)
 Solecurtus multistriatus (Scacchi, 1835): synonym of Solecurtus scopula (W. Turton, 1822)
 Solecurtus nitidus Gould, 1840: synonym of Siliqua squama (Blainville, 1827)
 Solecurtus novaculina G. B. Sowerby II, 1874: synonym of Novaculina gangetica Benson, 1830
 Solecurtus nuttallii Conrad, 1837: synonym of Siliqua patula (Dixon, 1789)
 Solecurtus pacificus Abbott & Dance, 1986: synonym of Solecurtus rhombus (Spengler, 1794)
 Solecurtus platensis d'Orbigny, 1846: synonym of Tagelus plebeius ([Lightfoot], 1786)
 Solecurtus politus Carpenter, 1857: synonym of Tagelus politus (Carpenter, 1857) (original combination)
 Solecurtus quoyi Deshayes, 1835: synonym of Solecurtus rhombus (Spengler, 1794)
 Solecurtus sanctaemarthae G. B. Sowerby II, 1874: synonym of Solecurtus rhombus (Spengler, 1794)
 Solecurtus solidus Gray G. B. Sowerby II, 1874: synonym of Azorinus abbreviatus (Gould, 1861)
 Solecurtus squama Blainville, 1827: synonym of Siliqua squama (Blainville, 1827)
 Solecurtus strigillatus [sic]: synonym of Solecurtus strigilatus (Linnaeus, 1758) (misspelling of Solenocurtus strigilatus (Linnaeus, 1758))
 Solecurtus strigosus Gould, 1861: synonym of Pharella acutidens (Broderip & Sowerby, 1829)
 Solecurtus subteres Conrad, 1837: synonym of Tagelus subteres (Conrad, 1837)
 Solecurtus tenerior Hedley, 1914: synonym of Cultellus tenerior (Hedley, 1914) (original combination)
 Solecurtus violascens Carpenter, 1857: synonym of Tagelus californianus (Conrad, 1837)
 Solecurtus viridens G. B. Sowerby II, 1874: synonym of Tagelus divisus (Spengler, 1794)

References

 Jensen, R. H. (1997). A Checklist and Bibliography of the Marine Molluscs of Bermuda. Unp. , 547 pp
 Spencer, H.G., Marshall, B.A. & Willan, R.C. (2009). Checklist of New Zealand living Mollusca. Pp 196-219. in: Gordon, D.P. (ed.) New Zealand inventory of biodiversity. Volume one. Kingdom Animalia: Radiata, Lophotrochozoa, Deuterostomia. Canterbury University Press, Christchurch
 Coan, E. V.; Valentich-Scott, P. (2012). Bivalve seashells of tropical West America. Marine bivalve mollusks from Baja California to northern Peru. 2 vols, 1258 pp

External links
 Blainville, H. M. D. de. (1824). Mollusques, Mollusca (Malacoz.), pp. 1-392. In: Dictionnaire des Sciences Naturelles (F. Cuvier, ed.), vol. 32. Levrault, Strasbourg et Paris, & Le Normant, Paris
  Gofas, S.; Le Renard, J.; Bouchet, P. (2001). Mollusca. in: Costello, M.J. et al. (eds), European Register of Marine Species: a check-list of the marine species in Europe and a bibliography of guides to their identification. Patrimoines Naturels. 50: 180-213

Solecurtidae
Bivalve genera